" is Thelma Aoyama's sixth single, and her first in 2009. It was released on  March 11, 2009. The CD+DVD edition of the single includes a music video. This is Aoyama's first double A-side single.

Track listing

Charting and release 
The single debuted at #32 on the Oricon Weekly Chart and sold 3,015 physical copies that week.

External links 
 Oricon Profile
 Official Discography

2009 singles
Thelma Aoyama songs
2009 songs
Universal J singles